Rhubarb Radio is a local commercial radio station based in Wakefield city centre, it serves the whole of the Wakefield district including the 5 Towns, Dewsbury & Batley. It is operated by volunteers who bring a wealth of experience to the station. 
Rhubarb Radio launched as a commercial local radio service in Wakefield on 1 October 2017 at midday. It plays a variety of hits from the 1970s to today. The radio station can be heard on tuneIn Radio, Radio-live-uk.com, on smartphones and tablets by downloading the free app and on Smartspeakers. Also soon to be launched on DAB across the Wakefield district, Dewsbury & Batley around late 2022.

In early 2021, a second station under the Rhubarb Radio brand was launched - Rhubarb Smoothies Radio, this station plays a wide selection of mellow music

Rhubarb Smoothies Radio 
Rhubarb Smoothies is the first of the planned spin-off stations from Rhubarb Radio and was launched in 2021 as a lifestyle station with an easy listening music policy.

See also
Rhubarb Radio (Birmingham)

References

External links

Radio-live-uk.com

Internet radio stations in the United Kingdom
Radio stations in Yorkshire
Radio stations established in 2017
Companies based in Wakefield